Sir Alfred Maurice Low (14 July 1860 – 17 June 1929) was a British-American journalist and author.

Biography
Low was born in London to Jewish parents Therese (1835–1887) and Maximillian Loewe (1830–1900), who emigrated to Britain from Hungary following the 1848 uprising. His siblings included journalists Sir Sidney Low, Frances Helena, and Barbara Low. Low was educated at King's College School in that city, and afterward in Austria, and later obtained a Master's degree from Dartmouth College.

From 1888 he was correspondent at Washington, D.C., for the Boston Globe, and from 1896 for the London Daily Chronicle, being the first Washington correspondent to be appointed by an English paper. From 1896 he also edited the American department of the London National Review. He later became Chief American Correspondent of the London Morning Post.

Low was a foreign correspondent in Cuba during the Spanish–American War, and went on to devote a large portion of his life to the study of Anglo-American relations. He wrote "The United States and Its Dependencies" for the Annual Register (London, 1901); and was a contributor to other influential magazines in England and America, including Collier's Weekly, Harper's Weekly, The Forum, North American Review, Scribner's, McClure's, and The Fortnightly Review. He was the author of The Supreme Surrender, a novel (New York, 1901).

Low argued in favor of an imperial federation.

His efforts to promote the Allied cause in the United States during the World War I were rewarded by a knighthood as part of the 1922 Birthday Honours. He died of arteriosclerosis in Washington on 17 June 1929.

Publications

References
 

1860 births
1929 deaths
19th-century American journalists
19th-century British journalists
20th-century American journalists
American male journalists
20th-century British journalists
American people of Hungarian-Jewish descent
Dartmouth College alumni
English emigrants to the United States
English male journalists
English people of Hungarian-Jewish descent
English war correspondents
American foreign correspondents
Jewish American journalists
Journalists from London
Knights Bachelor
People educated at King's College School, London
Recipients of the Order of Leopold II
Recipients of the Order of the Rising Sun
British foreign correspondents